Mary Edmunds may refer to:

 Mary Ellen Edmunds (born 1940), American religious public speaker, author and nurse
 Mary Anne Edmunds (1813–1858), Welsh educator